Count Carlo Ceppi (11 October 1829 – after 1900) was an Italian architect, active mainly in Piedmont.

In 1870, he designed the facade of the church for the nuns of the order of Adoratrice Perpetua delle Santissime Sacramento in Turin. With Stefano Molli, he designed the church of the SS Cuore di Maria in Borgo San Salvatore of Turin and San Gioachino in Turin. He worked with the architects Constantino Gilodi and the engineer Giacomo Salvadori in designing some of the pavilions (labor, architecture, and war) for the 1898 exposition in Turin.

References

1829 births
Architects from Turin
19th-century Italian architects
Year of death missing